Travis T. Flory (born May 24, 1992 in Fontana, California) is an American singer and actor best known for his role as Joey Caruso on Everybody Hates Chris. He has been a resident in a small city named Yucaipa, California.

Filmography

Film
The 12 Dogs of Christmas (2005) as Denny Doyle
License to Wed (2007) as Church Kid Manny
Mostly Ghostly: Who Let the Ghosts Out? (2008) as Billy
Step Brothers (2008) as Red-head kid
Little Boy (2015) as Soda Fountain Clerk

Television
The Bernie Mac Show
Becker (1999) as Kid on ice (1999, one episode)
Band of Brothers (2001) as Dutch Resistance kid
Zoey 101 (2005) as Jake (2005, one episode)
Nip/Tuck (2006) as Morgan Thompson (2006, one episode)
Everybody Hates Chris (2005–2009) as Joey Caruso (recurring role)
Gary Unmarried (2009, one episode) as Wrestling coach's son (Gary's Big Mouth)

References

External links

1992 births
Living people
Musicians from San Bernardino, California
Male actors from California
American male child actors
American male film actors
American male television actors